Adobogiona is the name of several Galatian princesses in the 1st century BC.

Adobogiona, a Galatian queen, daughter of king Deiotarus, spouse of Brogitarus, and mother of Amyntas of Galatia
Adobogiona the Elder, a mistress of king Mithridates VI of Pontus, mother of Mithridates of Pergamon and Adobogiona the Younger
Adobogiona the Younger, an illegitimate daughter of king Mithridates VI of Pontus, mother of Deiotarus Philadelphus, the last king of Paphlagonia